Air Chief Marshal Sir Brendan James Jackson,  (23 August 1935 – 19 November 1998) was a Royal Air Force officer who became Deputy Commander of RAF Strike Command.

RAF career
Born on 23 August 1935, Jackson was educated at Chichester High School For Boys and the University of London. He then joined the Royal Air Force on a national service commission in 1956. As a junior officer, he successfully ejected from a Victor B2 which became uncontrollable during a night training exercise on 20 March 1963. Jackson also became a qualified interpreter. He was appointed Officer Commanding No. 13 Squadron in 1966 and went on to be Station Commander at RAF Marham in 1977. He was made Director of Air Staff Plans at the Ministry of Defence in 1979 and then Assistant Chief of Staff (Policy) at SHAPE in 1984. He went on to be Chief of Staff and Deputy Commander-in-Chief, Strike Command in 1986 and Air Member for Supply and Organisation in 1988. He wrote a paper entitled "Nuclear Forces – The Ultimate Umbrella" in 1991, in which he wrote that Third World nuclear proliferation was even "more chimerical" than the threat from Russian nuclear weapons. He retired in 1993.

Family
In 1959 he married Shirley Norris; they had one son and one daughter.

References

|-

1935 births
1998 deaths
Royal Air Force air marshals
Knights Grand Cross of the Order of the Bath
Military personnel from London